Hans-Georg von Seidel (11 November 1891 – 10 November 1955) was a German military leader who served in the German Army during World War I and in the Luftwaffe (German Air Force) during World War II. Seidel was promoted to the rank of General der Flieger (General of the Air).

Seidel served for most of World War II as the head of German Air Force organization, armament, maintenance, and supply. He was a practical realist who distanced himself from his idealist boss Hans Jeschonnek, Luftwaffe Chief of Staff, an unquestioning follower of Adolf Hitler. Seidel attempted to implement the expansive Nazi war plans but suffered from heavy combat losses of materiel and men. After the war, Seidel was chosen leader of the high-ranking prisoners of war at Island Farm.

Early career
Hans-Georg von Seidel was born in the farming village of Diedersdorf in the county of Lebus, a rural district in the Province of Brandenburg, Kingdom of Prussia, on 11 November 1891. Seidel joined the German Army in Prussia in 1910 and was promoted to the rank of lieutenant in 1911. He served as an officer in the German Army during World War I, and left the service in 1920 as a captain of cavalry.

In 1934, Seidel was called to serve in the military: this time in the Air Ministry with a promotion to major. Not yet a pilot, Seidel was detached in August 1935 to the flying school at Braunschweig to take the aerial observer course and the pilot course. He then attended the Kampffliegerschule (bomber flying school) at Jüterbog where he learned to fly multi-engine aircraft. At the end of 1935, Seidel was posted to the General Staff of the German Air Force at the Air Ministry where he served as a department chief, and was soon promoted to lieutenant colonel.

In March 1937, Seidel accepted the command of an air group, Aufklärungsgruppe 12 (Reconnaissance Group 12) and was simultaneously given command of the group's airfield at Stargard-Klützow.

World War II

On 16 April 1938 Seidel was named Generalquartiermeister der Luftwaffe, the top staff officer in charge of supply and administration for the German Air Force, a position he held for the next six years. He served under Hans Jeschonnek, an ardent Nazi and an airman prone to making significant strategic mistakes, such as opposing the production of four-engine bombers in favor of dive bombers. To Jeschonnek, the Quartermaster General should have been his second-most important assistant after the Chief of Operations, but Jeschonnek suffered a cold relationship with Seidel. The two men worked hundreds of kilometres apart, with no contact for months on end, though their plans were intimately tied. On five occasions, Seidel requested a transfer and was refused each time. Seidel tried to keep the Luftwaffe supply lines from breaking, but Hitler's ideas and Jeschonnek's plans were too difficult to counter. Seidel agreed with top airman Hermann Göring and influential General Erhard Milch that their leader was a negative factor in air planning. After the war, Seidel said, "Hitler understood nothing about flying and cared less."

In 1939, Seidel formed two Flugzeug-Überführungsgruppen (aircraft ferry groups) to streamline the delivery of new aircraft to combat air groups. Prior to this the aircraft were sometimes flown to combat groups by airmen posted to the Supply and Procurement Groups, and sometimes were picked up by combat fliers with a resulting disruption to manpower availability at the front.

When Germany invaded Poland on 1 September 1939, the Luftwaffe was worked hard, and the supply chain was stretched taut. Before the attack, aviation gas reserves were at 400,000 tonnes and Seidel, promoted to major general the day the war started, demanded that they be increased to 600,000 tonnes, a six-month supply, before offensive operations were begun. His numbers "were ridiculed as 'exaggerated'." The expenditure of aerial munitions in the operation went beyond expectations, taking some 3,000 tonnes, a third of the total stock of explosives. Many aircraft were lost to Polish anti-aircraft fire, and some from fighter aircraft opposition and operational accidents. Seidel reported that as of 28 September 1939, 285 aircraft were lost to all causes, while 279 additional aircraft were damaged more than ten per cent and required major repairs. Aircrew losses were 189 dead, 126 wounded, and 224 missing, with 195 more casualties among Luftwaffe ground personnel and Fliegerabwehrkanone (flak) units.

Seidel saw that aircraft testing areas were needed behind front lines, so that newly delivered aircraft could be assessed and given minor field modifications appropriate to their employment in battle. He established such testing areas, and also used them for final assembly of any light aircraft shipped by rail.

In autumn 1940, Seidel was informed by Hermann Göring, leader of the Luftwaffe, of Adolf Hitler's plan to invade the Soviet Union the next summer. Along with other top air officers, Seidel was astonished at the idea and doubtful of success. He warned Göring that the Luftwaffe could not possibly cope with this demand. Göring insisted that there was no alternative, that he had already tried to change Hitler's mind.

Mannerheim's birthday

Upon the occasion of the 75th birthday of the Marshal of Finland, Baron Carl Gustaf Emil Mannerheim, Hitler flew to Finland to visit him. On the morning of 4 June 1942 at Immola airfield near Imatra, Seidel was the first German general to arrive, followed within a few hours by Generaloberst Hans-Jürgen Stumpff, Generaloberst Eduard Dietl, and then Feldmarschall Wilhelm Keitel who accompanied Hitler. Finnish and German officers reviewed troops in the airfield, then the officers met in a rail car for a few hours. The visiting Germans flew out in the evening.

Eastern front
For the 800,000 Luftwaffe personnel on the Eastern Front, Seidel was able to work with Milch to secure extra woollen underwear, fur boots, and other winter wear. However, beginning in October 1942 during the Battle of Stalingrad, Seidel sought desperately to find enough aircraft to supply the surrounded Sixth Army by air–the Junkers Ju 52 transports of Luftflotte 4 (Air Fleet 4) were not sufficient, and Hitler had ordered the army to stand and fight. On 23 November, Seidel ordered all German ministry, training, and staff aircraft of any size to join the airlift into Stalingrad. Some 600 aircraft flown by highly skilled instructors were taken from training facilities and sent east, with the result that some specialized training schools were closed. Aircraft as various as Heinkel He 111 bombers, Focke-Wulf Fw 200 Condor reconnaissance patrol bombers, Junkers Ju 90 airliners, and Junkers Ju 86 trainers were pressed into airlift service. Many that arrived at eastern air bases were pushed aside as useless until they could be winterized. By 19 December, the collection of aircraft were at their peak of delivery, with 289 tonnes of supplies dropped in 154 sorties on that day. The Sixth Army needed 700–800 tonnes each day, with food and munitions as top priority, but they received only a fraction of that, and some deliveries such as spices and summer clothing were completely useless to the troops. Severe winter conditions and unrelenting Soviet attacks took a heavy toll of the ground and air forces. Some 488 aircraft were lost along with some 1,000 of the Luftwaffe finest airmen. Seidel noted the great equipment losses in that theatre: "Of 100,000 Luftwaffe vehicles in the East, only 15 per cent still functioning early in January 1942." The aircraft evacuated 42,000 men, mostly wounded, with the last one flown out on 24 January 1943. The Sixth Army surrendered on 3 February.

Hitler blamed Göring for the disaster in East, after which Göring announced that he would court-martial Jeschonnek and Seidel for causing the failure of the Stalingrad airlift. Hitler forbade this action as he knew the two men were not at fault. Hitler considered Göring to be second only to himself in terms of guilt for the over-optimistic planning.

From July 1944 to February 1945 Seidel served in Berlin as commander of Luftflotte 10 (Air Fleet 10), a training and replacement organization. Late in February he was named leader of the Reserve Luftwaffe High Command, a position he was to hold for a few months until the end of the war.

Post-war
Seidel was taken prisoner of war on 6 May 1945 at Oberaudorf by American troops. On 17 May he was transferred to British supervision. On 9 January 1946, Seidel was taken to Island Farm where he became the leader of the prisoners at Special Camp 11. In that role he worked with Rear Admiral Hans Voss who was liaison to the British authorities. Seidel headed a group of German officers who ranked above him, ones charged with war crimes or being held as witnesses, including Field Marshals Gerd von Rundstedt, Erich von Manstein, Paul Ludwig Ewald von Kleist, and Walter von Brauchitsch. He was interviewed for his views on the war, and gave his opinion that the invasion of Germany would have failed except for Allied air power disrupting German supply lines. He said that this was "the decisive factor..." On 12 May 1948 after three years of imprisonment, Seidel began the process of repatriation.

In 1949, Seidel gave a lecture about how the supply of aviation fuel was a major factor in the war. In the early 1950s, he corresponded with authors seeking further information about the war. Seidel died in Bad Godesberg on 10 November 1955.

A Bundeswehr barracks at Trier was named in his honor in 1965: General-von-Seidel-Kaserne (General von Seidel Barracks).

Commands and assignments
 18 March 1910 – 30 September 1913: Fahnenjunker and squadron officer in 1. Leib-Husaren-Regiment Nr.1.
 1 October 1913 – 2 August 1917: Squadron officer and squadron commander in Husaren-Regiment Kaiser Nikolaus II von Rußland (1. Westfälisches ) Nr.8.
 3 August – 31 October 1917: Ordnance officer on the staff of 77th Reserve Division.
 1 November 1917 – 30 June 1918: Chief Supply Officer (Ib) on the staff of 2nd Infantry Division.
 1 July – 13 December 1918: Chief Supply Officer (Ib) on the General Staff of the Landwehr Corps.
 14 December 1918 – 11 August 1919: Consultant in the Operations Department of the Army High Command, General Staff of the Field Army and General Staff of the Army.
 12 August – 25 September 1919: Transferred to the Kommandostelle of the General Staff of the Army in Kolberg.
 26 September – 27 November 1919: Transferred to the Abwicklungsstelle of the General Staff of the Army.
 28 November 1919 – 26 April 1920: Consultant in the Army Command/Reich War Ministry.
 26 April 1920: Separated from the Army.
 1 May 1934: Returned to military service with the Luftwaffe.
 1 May 1934 – 30 November 1935: Consultant in the Air Command Department, Reich Air Ministry.
 18 August – 11 October 1935: Detached to aerial observer course at the Flying School Braunschweig and at the Kampffliegerschule (Bomber Flying School) Jüterbog.
 1 December 1935 – 28 February 1937: Department Chief in the General Staff of the Luftwaffe, Reich Air Ministry.
 1 March 1937 – 15 April 1938: Commander of Aufklärungsgruppe 12 (Reconnaissance Group 12) and, at the same time, Military Airfield Commandant Stargard-Klützow.
 16 April 1938 – 30 June 1944: Quartermaster General of the Luftwaffe.
 1 July 1944 – 27 February 1945: Commander-in-Chief of Luftflotte 10 (Air Fleet 10).
 27 February – 6 May 1945: Führer Reserve Luftwaffe High Command.
 6–17 May 1945: Prisoner of war in American captivity.
 17 May 1945 – 17 May 1948: Prisoner of war in British captivity.
9 January 1946 transferred to Island Farm Special Camp 11
12 May 1948 transferred to Camp 186 for repatriation.

Promotions
 Fahnenjunker-Unteroffizier: 5 August 1910
 Fähnrich: 16 November 1910
 Leutnant: 18 August 1911 (Patent 20 August 1909)
 Oberleutnant: 18 August 1915
 Rittmeister: 18 August 1918
 Hauptmann i.G.: 21 August 1918
 Major i.G.: 1 May 1934
 Oberstleutnant i.G.: 1 April 1936
 Oberst i.G.: 1 August 1938
 Generalmajor: 1 September 1939
 Generalleutnant: 19 July 1940
 General der Flieger: 1 January 1942

Awards

 Iron Cross of 1914, 1st and 2nd class
 Clasp to the Iron Cross, 1st and 2nd class
 Knight's Cross of the War Merit Cross with Swords as General der Flieger and Quartermaster General of the Luftwaffe (20 July 1944)
 Memel Medal
 Sudetenland Medal with clasp "Prague Castle"
 War Merit Cross, 1st and 2nd class with Swords
 Honour Cross of the World War 1914/1918
 Combined Pilots-Observation Badge
 Wehrmacht Long Service Award, Class IV (four years 1936–1940) and Class III (eight years 1936–1944)
 Order of the White Rose of Finland, Grand Cross (19 February 1941)
 Order of the Star of Romania, Grand Officer with Swords (23 December 1941)
 Finnish Order of the Cross of Liberty 1st Class with Oakleaves and Swords (31 March 1943)

References
Notes

Bibliography

 Barnett, Correlli. Hitler's Generals. Grove Press, 1989. 
 Bekker, Cajus. The Luftwaffe War Diaries: The German Air Force in World War II. Da Capo Press, 1994. 
 Boog, Horst; Gerhard Krebs; Detlef Vogel. Germany and the Second World War: Volume VII: The Strategic Air War in Europe and the War in the West and East Asia, 1943–1944/5. Oxford University Press, 2006. 
 Brett-Smith, Richard. Hitler's Generals. Osprey Publishing, 1976. 
 Craig, William. Enemy at the Gates: The Battle for Stalingrad. New York: Penguin Books paperback, 1973. 
 Hayward, Joel S.A. Stopped at Stalingrad: The Luftwaffe and Hitler's Defeat in the East, 1942–1943. Modern War Studies. University Press of Kansas, 1998. 
 Hooton, E.R. Luftwaffe at War; Gathering Storm 1933-39: Volume 1. Chevron/Ian Allan, London, 2007. 
 Hooton, E.R. Luftwaffe at War; Blitzkrieg in the West: Volume 2. Chevron/Ian Allan, London, 2007. 
 Hooton, E.R. Eagle in Flames: The Fall of the Luftwaffe. Weidenfeld Military, 1997. 
 Matikkala, Antti. Kunnian ruletti: Korkeimmat ulkomaalaisille 1941–1944 annetut suomalaiset kunniamerkit. Helsinki: Suomalaisen Kirjallisuuden Seura, 2017. 
 Mitcham, Samuel W. Men of the Luftwaffe. Presidio Press, 1988. 
 Suchenwirth, Richard. The development of the German Air Force, 1919–1939. Issue 160 of USAF historical studies, German Air Force in World War 2 Series. Ayer Publishing, 1970. 
 Suchenwirth, Richard. Command and leadership in the German Air Force. Issue 174 of USAF historical studies, German Air Force in World War 2 Series. Ayer Publishing, 1970. 

1891 births
1955 deaths
People from Märkisch-Oderland
People from the Province of Brandenburg
German Army personnel of World War I
Prussian Army personnel
Luftwaffe World War II generals
Recipients of the clasp to the Iron Cross, 1st class
Grand Officers of the Order of the Star of Romania
Recipients of the Knights Cross of the War Merit Cross
Recipients of the Order of the Cross of Liberty, 1st Class
Luftwaffe pilots
German prisoners of war in World War II held by the United Kingdom
German untitled nobility
Generals of Aviators